Tempel Synagogue  was a synagogue at the Old Market Square 14 (the historic Fish Market) in Lviv, now Ukraine. Lviv was one of the first Galician cities to have a modernized synagogue. The Synagogue was destroyed by Nazi Germany in 1941, following Operation Barbarossa.

History
The Synagogue was built for the first time in the 17th century. The new one underwent construction from 1844 to 1845 based on design by Iwan Lewicki. The synagogue was a classical building with a large dome, inspired by the Viennese Main Synagogue located at Seitenstattgasse 4. The interior sanctuary was round, with seating facing forward and the Bimah placed at the front of the seating area, near the Torah Ark in a moderately reformed style, again like in Vienna. Also in the modernized style was the elevated pulpit with an architectural canopy from which the rabbi preached the sermon in the vernacular (i.e., not in Yiddish.) A double tier of women's balconies ran around the perimeter of the room, old photographs reveal an elaborately decorated classical space reminiscent of the great opera houses of the era.

The first Rabbi, Abraham Kohn, was considered a staunch traditionalist in his native Bohemia. He refused to participate at the third Reform conference in Breslau, held in 1846, and argued that only a wall-to-wall rabbinical consensus would have sufficed to enact even moderate alterations in religious conduct. However, in the backward eastern province where Yiddish was still the Jewish vernacular and secular studies for rabbis were unheard of, Kohn immediately found himself at the position of an ultra-progressive. He was poisoned in 1848, under unknown circumstances. The strictly Orthodox Jews of Lemberg, who opposed even his modestly progressive attitude, were suspect but none was found guilty.

Commemoration
The Synagogue was destroyed by the Nazis in 1941. There is a memorial stone and placard at the location of the synagogue that reads: "This is the site of the synagogue of the progressive Jews called "The Temple" which served Lviv's Intelligentsia. It was built during 1844-1845 and was destroyed by German soldiers on entering to Lviv in July 1941."

Gallery

Notes and references

Synagogues in Lviv
Synagogues destroyed by Nazi Germany
Synagogues completed in 1845
Former synagogues in Ukraine
Buildings and structures demolished in 1941
Buildings and structures destroyed during World War II